Strawberry Shortcake: Housewarming Surprise is an 1983 American animated television special that first premiered in New York City on March 31, 1983 and in Los Angeles, California on April 1. This is the first Strawberry Shortcake television special produced by Nelvana and also the first Strawberry Shortcake television special to be distributed by Lexington Broadcast Services. The following year in 1984, Strawberry Shortcake: Housewarming Surprise was released onto home video, being VHS.

Synopsis
Strawberry Shortcake: Housewarming Surprise chronicles Strawberry Shortcake's move into a new house. Her friends, including several new ones she met on a recent "around the world" vacation come to visit her. The villains attempt to ruin the fun by stealing all the recipes Strawberry's international friends bring with them.

Cast

Production
Housewarming Surprise was the first Strawberry Shortcake special produced by Nelvana, the previous three having been produced by Romeo Muller, Robert L. Rosen, and Fred Wolf. Bernard Loomis and Carole MacGillvray served as executive producers.

Release
The special premiered on March 31, 1983 on WCBS-TV in New York City, and on April 1 on KTLA in Los Angeles. It was subsequently released on VHS by Family Home Entertainment in early 1984.

See also
 List of 1980s Strawberry Shortcake specials

References

External links
 
 Bit the Dust Tape - QuickTime files of the first five specials.

1983 television films
1983 films
1983 television specials
Animated television specials
Canadian television specials
Strawberry Shortcake films
Nelvana television specials
1980s American films